Urophora mauritanica is a species of tephritid or fruit flies in the genus Urophora of the family Tephritidae.

Distribution
Spain & Morocco to Israel.

References

Urophora
Insects described in 1851
Diptera of Africa
Diptera of Europe